Shahrak-e Shahid Karimi (also Romanized as Shahrak-e Shahīd Karīmī; also known as Shahrak-e Shahīd Mehdī-ye Karīmī, Shalgahié ‘Olya, Shalgahī-ye Bālā, Shalgehī-ye Bālā, Shalgehī-ye ‘Olyā, Shalgahi (Persian: شلگهي), and Shalgī) is a village in Choghamish Rural District, Choghamish District, Dezful County, Khuzestan Province, Iran. At the 2006 census, its population was 1,423, in 316 families.

References 

Populated places in Dezful County